The 2019 Atlantic hurricane season was an event in the annual tropical cyclone season in the north Atlantic Ocean. It was the fourth consecutive above-normal Atlantic hurricane season. The season officially began on June 1, 2019 and ended on November 30, 2019. These dates, adopted by convention, historically describe the period in each year when most tropical systems form. However, storm formation is possible at any time of the year, as demonstrated in 2019 by the formation of the season's first named storm, Subtropical Storm Andrea, on May 20. The final storm of the season, Tropical Storm Sebastien, transitioned to an extratropical cyclone on November 25.

The National Oceanic and Atmospheric Administration's 2019 seasonal outlook called for 1017 named storms, including 59 hurricanes and 24 major hurricanes. Altogether, the season produced 18 named storms, including six hurricanes of which three intensified into major hurricanes. Two major hurricanes, Dorian and Lorenzo, became Category 5 storms, causing the season to become the fourth consecutive with at least one Category 5 hurricane. Dorian inflicted catastrophic damage across the Bahamas. The hurricane killed at least 70 people and caused at least US$3.4 billion in damage, making it the costliest hurricane in the country's history.  While Lorenzo did not affect land as a Category 5 hurricane, it caused US$367 million in damage and killed 19, with over half of the deaths being attributed to the sinking of a tugboat known as the Bourbon Rhode. In March 2021, the name Dorian was retired from reuse in the North Atlantic by the World Meteorological Organization.

This timeline documents tropical cyclone formations, strengthening, weakening, landfalls, extratropical transitions, and dissipations during the season. It includes information that was not released throughout the season, meaning that data from post-storm reviews by the National Hurricane Center, such as a storm that was not initially warned upon, has been included.

By convention, meteorologists use one time zone when issuing forecasts and making observations: Coordinated Universal Time (UTC), and also use the 24-hour clock (where 00:00 = midnight UTC). The National Hurricane Center uses both UTC and the time zone where the center of the tropical cyclone is currently located. The time zones utilized (east to west) prior to 2020 were: Atlantic, Eastern, and Central. In this timeline, all information is listed by UTC first with the respective regional time included in parentheses. Additionally, figures for maximum sustained winds and position estimates are rounded to the nearest 5 units (knots, miles, or kilometers), following the convention used in the National Hurricane Center's products. Direct wind observations are rounded to the nearest whole number. Atmospheric pressures are listed to the nearest millibar and nearest hundredth of an inch of mercury.

Timeline

May 

May 20
 18:00 UTC (2:00 p.m.

May 21
 00:00 UTC (8:00 p.m.
 12:00 UTC (8:00 a.m.

June 

June 1
 The 2019 Atlantic hurricane season officially begins.

July 

July 11
 00:00 UTC (7:00 p.m.
 06:00 UTC (1:00 a.m.

July 12
 18:00 UTC (1:00 p.m.

July 13
 12:00 UTC (7:00 a.m. CDT) at Tropical Storm Barry strengthens to a Category 1 hurricane, and simultaneously attains its peak sustained wind speed of 75 mph (120 km/h), south of the southcentral Louisiana coast.
 15:00 UTC (10:00 a.m.
 18:00 UTC (1:00 p.m.

July 15
 00:00 UTC (7:00 p.m.
 12:00 UTC (7:00 a.m. CDT) at Tropical Storm Barry becomes a remnant low while over western Arkansas, and subsequently dissipates over southern Missouri.

July 22
 12:00 UTC (8:00 a.m. EDT) at Tropical Depression Three forms from a tropical wave about 40 mi (65 km) east of Andros Island in the Bahamas.

July 23
 06:00 UTC (2:00 a.m.
 12:00 UTC (8:00 a.m.

August 

August 20
 18:00 UTC (2:00 p.m. AST) at Tropical Depression Four develops from an area of low pressure about 370 mi (590 km) southeast of Halifax, Nova Scotia.

August 21
 00:00 UTC (8:00 p.m.

August 22
 00:00 UTC (8:00 p.m. AST, August 21) at Tropical Storm Chantal weakens to a tropical depression about 547 mi (880 km) south-southeast of Cape Race, Newfoundland.

August 23
 18:00 UTC (2:00 p.m. AST) at Tropical Depression Chantal degenerates into a remnant low, and subsequently dissipates about 823 mi (1,324 km) southeast of Cape Race.

August 24
 06:00 UTC (2:00 a.m. AST) at Tropical Depression Five forms from a tropical wave roughly 810 mi (1,300 km) east-southeast of Barbados.
 18:00 UTC (2:00 p.m. AST) at Tropical Depression Five strengthens into Tropical Storm Dorian.

August 26
 12:00 UTC (8:00 a.m. EDT) at Tropical Depression Six forms from a broad area of low pressure roughly 350 mi (560 km) south-southeast of Cape Hatteras, North Carolina.

August 27
 01:30 UTC (9:30 p.m. AST, August 26) at Tropical Storm Dorian makes landfall at Barbados with sustained winds of 52 mph (83 km/h).
 11:00 UTC (7:00 a.m. AST) at Tropical Storm Dorian makes landfall at Saint Lucia with sustained winds of 50 mph (85 km/h).
 18:00 UTC (2:00 p.m. EDT) at Tropical Depression Six strengthens into Tropical Storm Erin.

August 28
 06:00 UTC (2:00 a.m.
 15:30 UTC (11:30 a.m. AST) at Tropical Storm Dorian strengthens to a Category 1 hurricane, and simultaneously makes landfall at Saint Croix, United States Virgin Islands, with sustained winds of 75 mph (120 km/h).
 18:00 UTC (2:00 p.m. AST) at Hurricane Dorian makes landfall at Saint Thomas, U.S. Virgin Islands, with sustained winds of 80 mph (130 km/h).
 18:00 UTC (2:00 p.m. EDT) at Tropical Storm Erin weakens to a tropical depression.

August 29
 12:00 UTC (8:00 a.m. EDT) at Tropical Depression Erin transitions to an extratropical cyclone about 290 mi (460 km) east of Norfolk, Virginia and is later absorbed by a larger extratropical low.

August 30
 03:00 UTC (11:00 p.m. AST, August 29) at Hurricane Dorian strengthens to a Category 2 hurricane roughly 295 mi (470 km) east-northeast of the southeastern Bahamas.
 18:00 UTC (2:00 p.m. AST) at Hurricane Dorian strengthens to a Category 3 hurricane roughly 445 mi (715 km) east of the northwestern Bahamas.

August 31
 00:30 UTC (8:30 p.m. AST, August 30) at Hurricane Dorian strengthens to a Category 4 hurricane roughly 400 mi (645 km) east of the northwestern Bahamas.

September 

September 1
 12:00 UTC (8:00 a.m. EDT) at Hurricane Dorian strengthens to a Category 5 hurricane about 35 mi (55 km) east of Great Abaco Island.
16:40 UTC (12:40 p.m.

September 2
 02:15 UTC (10:15 p.m. EDT, September 1) at Hurricane Dorian makes landfall at South Riding Point, Grand Bahama with maximum sustained winds of 180 mph (285 km/h).
 15:00 UTC (11:00 a.m. EDT) at Hurricane Dorian weakens to a Category 4 hurricane roughly 30 mi (50 km) northeast of Freeport, Bahamas.

September 3
 5:00 UTC (1:00 a.m. EDT) at Hurricane Dorian weakens to a Category 3 hurricane roughly 25 mi (40 km) northeast of Freeport, Bahamas.
 12:00 UTC (7:00 a.m. CDT) at Tropical Storm Fernand forms from an upper-level low roughly 200 mi (310 km) east of La Pesca, Tamaulipas.
 15:00 UTC (11:00 a.m. EDT) at Hurricane Dorian weakens to a Category 2 hurricane roughly 45 mi (70 km) north of Freeport, Bahamas.
 18:00 UTC (2:00 p.m. AST) at Tropical Depression Eight forms from a tropical wave roughly 455 mi (732 km) west of the Cabo Verde Islands.

September 4
 00:00 UTC (7:00 a.m.
 00:00 UTC (8:00 p.m. AST, September 3) at Tropical Depression Eight strengthens to Tropical Storm Gabrielle.
 15:30 UTC (10:30 a.m. CDT) at Tropical Storm Fernand makes landfall about 30 mi (45 km) north-northeast of La Pesca.
 18:00 UTC (1:00 p.m. CDT) at Tropical Storm Fernand weakens to a tropical depression and later dissipates roughly 130 mi (205 km) west-southwest of the mouth of Rio Grande River.

September 5
 03:00 UTC (11:00 p.m. EDT September 4) at Hurricane Dorian re-intensifies to a Category 3 hurricane roughly 105 mi (170 km) south of Charleston, South Carolina
 15:00 UTC (11:00 a.m. EDT) at Hurricane Dorian again weakens to a Category 2 hurricane roughly 50 mi (80 km) east-southeast of Charleston, South Carolina.

September 6
 12:30 UTC (8:30 a.m. EDT) at Hurricane Dorian makes landfall at Cape Hatteras, North Carolina with maximum sustained winds of 100 mph (155 km/h).

September 7
 18:00 UTC (2:00 p.m. AST) at Hurricane Dorian becomes a strong Category 1-equivalent post-tropical cyclone about 140 mi (225 km) south-southwest of Halifax, Nova Scotia.
 22:15 UTC (6:15 p.m. AST) at Post-Tropical Cyclone Dorian makes landfall near Sambro Creek, Nova Scotia roughly 15 mi (25 km) south of Halifax with maximum sustained winds of 100 mph (155 km/h).

September 8
 06:00 UTC (2:00 a.m. AST) at Post-Tropical Cyclone Dorian becomes extratropical over the Gulf of St. Lawrence and is subsequently absorbed by a larger extratropical low over the northern Atlantic Ocean.
 18:00 UTC (2:00 p.m.

September 10
 12:00 UTC (8:00 a.m.

September 13
 18:00 UTC (2:00 p.m. EDT) at Tropical Depression Nine forms from a tropical wave about 85 mi (140 km) east of Eleuthera Island, Bahamas.

September 14
 03:00 UTC (11:00 p.m. EDT, September 13) at Tropical Depression Nine strengthens to Tropical Storm Humberto about 225 mi (365 km) east-southeast of Freeport, Bahamas.

September 16
 00:00 UTC (8:00 p.m. EDT, September 15) at Tropical Storm Humberto strengthens to a Category 1 hurricane about 170 mi (270 km) east-northeast of Cape Canaveral, Florida.

September 17
 00:00 UTC (8:00 p.m. AST, September 10) at Tropical Depression Ten forms from a tropical wave about 1,090 mi (1,760 km) east of the Windward Islands.
 12:00 UTC (8:00 a.m. EDT) at Hurricane Humberto intensifies into a Category 2 hurricane roughly 555 mi (895 km) west of Bermuda.
 12:00 UTC (7:00 a.m. CDT) at Tropical Depression Eleven forms from a mid- to upper-level trough about 45 mi (75 km) southwest of Freeport, Texas.
 15:00 UTC (10:00 a.m. CDT) at Tropical Depression Eleven strengthens to Tropical Storm Imelda.
 17:45 UTC (12:45 p.m.

September 18
 00:00 UTC (8:00 p.m. AST September 17) at Hurricane Humberto strengthens to a Category 3 hurricane roughly 405 mi (655 km) west-southwest of Bermuda.
 00:00 UTC (7:00 p.m. CDT September 17) at Tropical Storm Imelda weakens to a tropical depression roughly 5 mi (10 km) north of Houston, Texas.
 06:00 UTC (2:00 a.m. AST) at Tropical Depression Ten strengthens to Tropical Storm Jerry.
 18:00 UTC (2:00 p.m.

September 19
 00:00 UTC (7:00 p.m. CDT, September 18) at Tropical Depression Imelda degenerates into a trough about 120 mi (190 km) north-northeast of Houston, and subsequently dissipates.
 12:00 UTC (8:00 a.m. AST) at Hurricane Humberto weakens to a Category 2 hurricane.
 12:00 UTC (8:00 a.m. AST) at Tropical Storm Jerry strengthens to a Category 1 hurricane about 520 mi (830 km) east of the Leeward Islands.
 18:00 UTC (2:00 p.m. AST) at Hurricane Humberto weakens to a Category 1 hurricane.

September 20
 00:00 UTC (8:00 p.m. AST September 19) at Hurricane Humberto transitions to an extratropical cyclone about 580 mi (930 km) south-southwest of Cape Race, Newfoundland and later merges with a larger extratropical low and frontal system.
 00:00 UTC (8:00 p.m.
 15:00 UTC (11:00 a.m. AST) at Hurricane Jerry weakens into a Category 1 hurricane roughly 130 mi (205 km) northeast of Barbuda and 190 mi (300 km) east-northeast of Anguilla.

September 21
 00:00 UTC (8:00 p.m. AST, September 20) at Hurricane Jerry weakens to a tropical storm as it passes about 140 mi (220 km) north of the Leeward Islands.

September 22
 00:00 UTC (8:00 p.m. AST September 21) at Tropical Depression forms from a tropical wave about 120 mi (190 km) east of Tobago.
 06:00 UTC (2:00 a.m. AST) at Tropical depression strengthens to Tropical Storm Karen.

September 23
 00:00 UTC (8:00 p.m. AST September 22) at Tropical Depression Thirteen forms from a tropical wave about 320 mi (520 km) southwest of Dakar, Senegal.
 06:00 UTC (2:00 a.m. AST) at Tropical Depression Thirteen strengthens to Tropical Storm Lorenzo.
 06:00 UTC (2:00 a.m. AST) at Tropical Storm Karen weakens to a tropical depression about 160 mi (260 km) west of Saint Vincent and about 315 mi (510 km) south-southeast of Saint Croix, U.S. Virgin Islands.

September 24
 06:00 UTC (2:00 a.m. AST) at Tropical Depression Karen re-strengthens to a tropical storm about 120 mi (190 km) south-southwest of Isla de Vieques, Puerto Rico.
 18:00 UTC (2:00 p.m. AST) at Tropical Storm Jerry transitions to a post-tropical cyclone about 282 mi (454 km) west-southwest of Bermuda and subsequently degenerates into an extratropical trough of low pressure.
 22:00 UTC (6:00 p.m. AST) at Tropical Storm Karen makes landfall at Vieques with sustained winds of 45 mph (75 km/h).
 23:00 UTC (7:00 p.m. AST) at Tropical Storm Karen makes landfall at Isla Culebra, Puerto Rico with sustained winds of 45 mph (75 km/h).

September 25
 00:00 UTC (8:00 p.m.
 06:00 UTC (2:00 a.m. AST) at Tropical Storm Lorenzo strengthens to a Category 1 hurricane.

September 26
 00:00 UTC (8:00 p.m. AST September 25) at Hurricane Lorenzo strengthens to a Category 2 hurricane.
 12:00 UTC (8:00 a.m. AST) at Hurricane Lorenzo strengthens to a Category 3 hurricane.
 18:00 UTC (2:00 p.m. AST) at Hurricane Lorenzo strengthens to a Category 4 hurricane.

September 27
 12:00 UTC (8:00 a.m. AST) at Tropical Storm Karen weakens to a tropical depression and dissipates shortly thereafter over the central Atlantic Ocean, about 350 mi (560 km) southeast of Bermuda.
 18:00 UTC (2:00 p.m. AST) at Hurricane Lorenzo weakens to a Category 3 hurricane.

September 28
 18:00 UTC (2:00 p.m. AST) at Hurricane Lorenzo re-strengthens to a Category 4 hurricane.

September 29
 03:00 UTC (11:00 p.m. AST September 28) at Hurricane Lorenzo strengthens to a Category 5 hurricane, and simultaneously reaches its peak intensity with maximum sustained winds of 160 mph (260 km/h) and a minimum barometric pressure of  about 1,600  (2,600 km) southwest of the Azores.
 06:00 UTC (2:00 a.m. AST) at Hurricane Lorenzo weakens to a Category 4 hurricane.
 12:00 UTC (8:00 a.m. AST) at Hurricane Lorenzo weakens to a Category 3 hurricane.
 18:00 UTC (2:00 p.m. AST) at Hurricane Lorenzo weakens to a Category 2 hurricane.

October

October 2
 06:00 UTC (2:00 a.m. AST) at Hurricane Lorenzo weakens to a Category 1 hurricane about 55 mi (90 km) north of Flores Island, Azores.
 12:00 UTC (8:00 a.m. AST) at Hurricane Lorenzo becomes a frontal post-tropical cyclone about 280 mi (440 km) north of Graciosa Island, Azores, and subsequently dissipates over northwest Ireland.

October 11
 06:00 UTC (2:00 a.m.

October 12
 12:00 UTC (8:00 a.m. AST) at Subtropical Storm Melissa transitions to a tropical storm about 260 mi (430 km) south-southeast of Nantucket.

October 14
 12:00 UTC (8:00 a.m. AST) at Tropical Storm Melissa becomes extratropical about 400 mi (650 km) south of Cape Race, Newfoundland as it merges with a nearby front and dissipates.
 12:00 UTC (8:00 a.m.

October 16
 06:00 UTC (2:00 a.m. AST) at Tropical Depression Fifteen degenerates into a broad area of low pressure near the Barlavento Islands group of the Cape Verde Islands and subsequently dissipates.

October 18
 18:00 UTC (1:00 p.m. CDT) at Tropical Storm Nestor forms from a tropical wave over the Bay of Campeche about 195 mi (315 km) south of the mouth of the Mississippi River.

October 19
 00:00 UTC (7:00 p.m. CDT, October 18) at Tropical Storm Nestor reaches its peak intensity with maximum sustained winds of 60 mph (95 km/h) and a minimum barometric pressure of 996 mbar (hPa; 29.42 inHg) about 140 mi (220 km) southeast of the mouth of the Mississippi River and about 215 mi (340 km) southwest of Panama City, Florida.
 15:00 UTC (10:00 a.m. CDT) at Tropical Storm Nestor becomes a post-tropical cyclone about 70 mi (115 km) of Panama City and about 85 mi (135 km) west-southwest of Apalachicola, Florida.
 18:00 UTC (1:00 p.m. CDT) at Post-Tropical Cyclone Nestor moves inland at St. Vincent Island, Florida, about 5 mi (10 km) west-southwest of Apalachicola, and subsequently degenerates into an open trough after moving offshore of the Virginia Atlantic coast.

October 25
 00:00 UTC (8:00 p.m. AST, October 24) at A subtropical storm develops from an extratropical area of low pressure about 400 mi (650 km) west-southwest of the western Azores.
 12:00 UTC (7:00 a.m. CDT) at Tropical Storm Olga forms from a tropical wave over the western Gulf of Mexico, about 390 mi (630 km) south-southwest of Lake Charles, Louisiana.
 18:00 UTC (1:00 p.m. CDT) at Tropical Storm Olga reaches its peak intensity with maximum sustained winds of 45 mph (75 km/h) and a minimum barometric pressure of 998 mbar (hPa; 29.47 inHg).
 18:00 UTC (12:00 p.m. AST) at The subtropical storm west-southwest of the Azores transitions into Tropical Storm Pablo.

October 26
 00:00 UTC (7:00 p.m. CDT, September 25) at Tropical Storm Olga becomes a post-tropical cyclone.
 07:00 UTC (2:00 a.m. CDT) at Post-tropical Cyclone Olga comes ashore south of Morgan City, Louisiana, and subsequently dissipates over Central Ontario.

October 27
 12:00 UTC (8:00 a.m. AST) at Tropical Storm Pablo strengthens to a Category 1 hurricane after passing just southeast of the Azores.
 18:00 UTC (2:00 p.m. AST) at Hurricane Pablo reaches its peak intensity with maximum sustained winds of 80 mph (130 km/h) and a minimum barometric pressure of 977 mbar (hPa; 28.85 inHg) roughly 650 mi (1,050 km) northeast of Lajes Air Base in the Azores.

October 28
 00:00 UTC (8:00 p.m. AST October 27) at Hurricane Pablo weakens to a tropical storm.
 12:00 UTC (8:00 a.m. AST) at Tropical Storm Pablo transitions into an extratropical cyclone about 720 miles (1,160 km) north-northeast of the eastern Azores and later dissipates.

October 30
 12:00 UTC (8:00 a.m.

November

November 1
 06:00 UTC (2:00 a.m. AST) at Subtropical Storm Rebekah becomes extratropical and later dissipates about 120 mi (190 km) north of the Azores.

November 19
 06:00 UTC (2:00 a.m. AST) at Tropical Storm Sebastien forms from a large area of disturbed weather about 270 mi (435 km) northeast of the Leeward Islands.

November 23
 00:00 UTC (8:00 p.m. AST, November 22) at Tropical Storm Sebastien reaches its peak intensity with maximum sustained winds of 70 mph (110 km/h) and a minimum barometric pressure of 991 mbar (hPa; 29.36 inHg).

November 25
 00:00 UTC (8:00 p.m. AST, November 24) at Tropical Storm Sebastien transitions into an extratropical cyclone near Flores Island, Azores and subsequently dissipates near Greater London.

November 30
The 2019 Atlantic hurricane season officially ends.

See also 

Lists of Atlantic hurricanes
Timeline of the 2019 Pacific hurricane season

Notes

References

External links

 2019 Tropical Cyclone Advisory Archive, National Hurricane Center and Central Pacific Hurricane Center
 Hurricanes and Tropical Storms – Annual 2019, National Centers for Environmental Information

2019 Atlantic hurricane season
2019